Papyrus Oxyrhynchus 86 (P. Oxy. 86) is a complaint of a pilot of a public boat, written in Greek. The manuscript was written on papyrus in the form of a sheet. It was discovered in Oxyrhynchus. The document was written on 28 March 338. Currently it is housed in the Cambridge University Library (Add. Ms. 4040) in Cambridge.

Description 
The letter contains a petition, addressed to Flavius Eusebius, a logistes (the same as in P. Oxy. 85). It was submitted on behalf of Aurelius Papnouthis by his wife Helena. Papnouthis complains that Eustochius, who was required by a leitourgia to either serve as a sailor on the boat or to pay the salary of a substitute, had failed to do so. The complaint was written out and signed by Aurelius Theon because, as he states regarding Helena, "she is illiterate." The measurements of the fragment are 253 by 100 mm.

It was discovered by Grenfell and Hunt in 1897 in Oxyrhynchus. The text was published by Grenfell and Hunt in 1898.

See also 
 Oxyrhynchus Papyri
 Papyrus Oxyrhynchus 85
 Papyrus Oxyrhynchus 87

References

External links 
 P. Oxy. I 86 – Heidelberger Gesamtverzeichnis der griechischen Papyrusurkunden Ägyptens

086
4th-century manuscripts
Manuscripts in Cambridge